Lake George is an unincorporated community and census-designated place (CDP) in Lake George Township, Hubbard County, Minnesota, United States.  As of the 2010 census, its population was 230.

The community is located along U.S. Highway 71 and State Highway 200 (MN 200) near Hubbard County Road 4.  Nearby places include Laporte, Park Rapids, and Itasca State Park.

Lake George has a post office with ZIP code 56458, which opened in 1903.

Demographics

References

Census-designated places in Hubbard County, Minnesota
Census-designated places in Minnesota
Unincorporated communities in Hubbard County, Minnesota
Unincorporated communities in Minnesota
Populated places established in 1903
1903 establishments in Minnesota